Charles Harold Williamson (born 16 March 1962) is an English retired professional footballer who played as a left back in the Football League for Sheffield Wednesday, Chesterfield, Southend United and Lincoln City. After retiring as a player, he undertook work as a coach, scout and served as Head of Recruitment at Chesterfield between June and December 2019.

Career statistics

References

1962 births
Living people
Footballers from Sheffield
English footballers
Association football fullbacks
Chesterfield F.C. players
Sheffield Wednesday F.C. players
Southend United F.C. players
Lincoln City F.C. players
English Football League players
Stafford Rangers F.C. players
National League (English football) players
Chesterfield F.C. non-playing staff
Sheffield Wednesday F.C. non-playing staff